This is a list of albums released under IST Entertainment.

2010

2011

2012

2013

2014

2015

2016

2017

2018

2019

2020

2021

2022

References

External links

Discography
Discographies of South Korean record labels
Pop music discographies